The 2020–21 season of the Ukrainian Football Championship is the 30th season of Ukraine's top women's football league. Consisting of two tiers it ran from 28 August 2020 to 29 May 2021.

The format of competitions for the season changed for both tiers. The ten teams play a single round robin and then split into two groups with the first six competing in a double round robin for championship and the other four for relegation. The bottom two teams were to be relegated. The second tier that also consisted of ten teams had all teams playing each other in a straight double round robin. The top two teams were to be promoted.

Vyshcha Liha teams

Team changes

Name changes
 During winter break Spartak-Orion Mykolaiv changed to Nika Mykolaiv.
 Mariupolchanka Mariupol changed to Mariupol.

Stadiums

Managers

First stage

League table

Results

Championship round

Championship round table

Results

Relegation round

Relegation round table

Results

Top scorers

Persha Liha teams

Team changes

Name changes
 During winter break SDIuShOR-16 Kyiv was replaced with OKIP Kyiv.
 Lviv-Iantarochka Novoyavorivsk changed its name to Iantarochka Novoyavorivsk.
 DIuSSh Iunist Chernihiv changed its name to Iunist-ShVSM Chernihiv following disbandment of Iednist-ShVSM Plysky.
 Kobra-DIuSSh Bilokurakyne changed its name to Kobra Bilokurakyne.

Persha Liha

Top scorer

References

External links
WFPL.ua
Women's Football.ua

2020-21
2020–21 in Ukrainian association football leagues
Ukraine, women